Warud is also known as Orange City and a municipal council in Amravati district in the Indian state of Maharashtra.

Demographics
As of 2011 Indian Census, Warud had a total population of 45,482, of which 23,182 were males and 22,300 were females. Population within the age group of 0 to 6 years was 4,413. The total number of literates in Warud was 37,422, which constituted 82.3% of the population with male literacy of 84.2% and female literacy of 80.2%. The effective literacy rate of 7+ population of Warud was 91.1%, of which male literacy rate was 93.8% and female literacy rate was 88.4%. The Scheduled Castes and Scheduled Tribes population was 4,952 and 3,409 respectively. Warud had 9957 households in 2011.

Transportation

Railway

Narkhed and Amravati towns in Maharashtra's orange belt have waited for more than 80 years to be linked by rail. The 140-km track was first sanctioned in 1928 under the British, but stayed on the backburner. The project was revived only in 1993–94 and a budget of Rs 2.84 billion approved.

The then Prime Minister P.V. Narasimha Rao laid the foundation stone. But protests by the Shiv Sena, which opposed the displacement of people, stalled the project for many more years.

In September 2008, when President Pratibha Patil inaugurated the New Amravati railway station, it seemed as if the project would be completed soon. Far from it. In November 2009, the Railway Ministry announced the link would be inaugurated in December 2010.

Narkhed-Amravati line is ready in January 2014. Railways are now available to travel from Narkhed to Bhusaval. Warud's railway station has given the name Warud Orange City because it is the biggest exporter of oranges from all over the India. The railway station is 3 km from the centre of the Warud city.

The Amravati - Chandur Bazar - Morshi - Warud Orange City - Narkher railway track is electrified. People of Warud can travel by train to cities like Amravati, Akola, Shegaon, Bhusawal, Washim, Hingoli, Nanded, Hyderabad, Narkher, Morshi, Chandur Bazar, Badnera, Indore, Bhopal, Banglore, Jaipur, Itarsi

Roadways
There is a Warud MSRTC Depot of Maharashtra State Transport (S.T. Bus) in Warud city. It has better connectivity with neighbouring towns and districts Amaravati, Akola, Nagpur, Yavatmal and Wardha. Buses for neighbouring state Madhya Pradesh are also available.

Agriculture
Shendurjana Ghat, Loni, Jarud, Jamgaon, Pusla, Isambri, Bahada, Tembhurkheda and Jamthi are the main exporters of oranges in Warud taluka. That is why it is also known as Orange City or California of India. Warud has an agriculture-based economy.

Places of interest
 Qutub E Warud Hazrat Mausam Shah Wali Dargah, Warud
 Hazrat Pathan Shah Baba Dargah, Pardi, Warud
 Hazrat Paanch Peer Baba Dargah, Warud 
 Alamgir Sunni Masjid, Warud
 Kedareshwar Temple Warud
 Kapileshwar Temple, Gavhankund, Warud
 Sai Mandir, Warud
 Gajanan Maharaj Temple Warud
 Shri Yashwant Baba Devasthan, Musalkheda, Warud
 Bhavani Mata Mandir, Pusla
 Digvijay Mahore ka Aada Warud

Healthcare
 Matoshree Hospital
 Arihant Hospital
Ambadkar Hospital

Educational institutions
Mahatma Fule Arts, Commerce & Sitaramji Choudhari Science Mahavidyalaya
Institute of Management Studies Mahavidyalaya
New English High School
Jagrut Vidyalaya
New Orange City Convent
NTR Highschool
Shanti Niketan English School
Late Appasaheb Deshmukh Vidyalaya, Shaniwar peth, Warud
 School of Scholars
 National English Primary School

References

Cities and towns in Amravati district
Amravati district
Talukas in Maharashtra